Senovo is a town in northeastern Bulgaria, part of Vetovo Municipality, Rousse Province, near Tsar Kaloyan.

Towns in Bulgaria
Populated places in Ruse Province